Abadan County is in Khuzestan province, Iran. The capital of the county is the city of Abadan on Abadan Island. At the 2006 census, the county's population was 275,126 in 58,870 households. The following census in 2011 counted 271,484 people in 69,946 households. At the 2016 census, the county's population was 298,090 in 85,015 households.

On May 11, 2020, Iran imposed a COVID-19 lockdown in Abadan County. All shops and offices in the county, except essential services, closed during this period. Authorities also closed access to Abadan from the Ahvaz and Bandar Mahshahr points of entry. These restrictions would expire on May 25.

Administrative divisions

The population history and structural changes of Abadan County's administrative divisions over three consecutive censuses are shown in the following table. The latest census shows two districts, six rural districts, and three cities.

References

 

Counties of Khuzestan Province